The Switzerland men's national field hockey team represents Switzerland in men's international field hockey competitions.

Tournament record

Summer Olympics
 1928 – 7th place
 1936 – 5th place
 1948 – 5th place
 1952 – 9th place
 1960 – 15th place

EuroHockey Championship
 1970 – 8th place
 1974 – 17th place
 1991 – 11th place
 1995 – 11th place
 1999 – 10th place
 2003 – 11th place

EuroHockey Championship II
 2005 – 6th place
 2007 – 4th place
 2009 – 8th place
 2015 – 7th place
 2017 – 7th place
 2021 – 7th place

EuroHockey Championship III
 2011 – 4th place
 2013 – 
 2019 –

Hockey World League
 2012–13 – Round 1
 2014–15 – 25th place
 2016–17 – 30th place

FIH Hockey Series
2018–19 – First round

See also
Switzerland women's national field hockey team

References

External links
Official website
FIH profile

European men's national field hockey teams
Field hockey
National team
Men's sport in Switzerland